This is a list of bus routes operated by the San Mateo County Transit District (SamTrans) primarily in San Mateo County of the San Francisco Bay Area, in the state of California.

Notes:
 †: San Francisco stops restriction applies
 Northbound (from San Mateo County): SamTrans cannot pick up northbound passengers at San Francisco stops
 Southbound (to San Mateo County): Passengers boarding in San Francisco may not disembark in San Francisco
 NB – northbound, SB – southbound
 Sunday service is run during most holidays.

Route numbering scheme 

Notes

Express routes 
SamTrans discontinued its last express route, KX, by merging it into line 398 in August 2018. Since then, the samTrans board adopted the Express Bus Feasibility Study on December 5, 2018. The agency has recommended launching six new express routes, starting with two pilot routes scheduled to begin in summer 2019. The first route will travel between San Francisco and Foster City along US 101, and the second route will travel between San Francisco (Divisadero and Geary) and Palo Alto via I-280 and 19th Avenue in San Francisco. In the second phase, two new express routes will take advantage of managed lanes that will be added to US 101; one will provide service between San Bruno and East Palo Alto, and the other will run between San Mateo (via park-and-ride) and downtown San Francisco. The fifth and sixth new express routes will provide service between San Mateo and western San Francisco, and between Burlingame and downtown San Francisco.

An early-morning weekday express route with limited trips, separate from the pilot program, was introduced on February 11, 2019. Route 713 provides replacement service for BART between 4:00 am and 5:00 am while seismic retrofit work is performed in the Transbay Tube. It runs between the Temporary Transbay Terminal and Millbrae station via SFO.

The first new express route, designated FCX, is scheduled to start service on August 19, 2019. FCX will operate five to six trips in each direction with headways of approximately 30 minutes during peak weekday commute hours, using recent buses that feature onboard Wi-Fi.

Local bus lines with BART connections 
These bus lines are SamTrans lines that connect to Bay Area Rapid Transit (BART) stations along San Mateo County. These lines are identified with a "1" in the first digit of the three digit line number.

Local bus lines with Caltrain connection 
These bus lines are SamTrans lines that connect to Caltrain stations in San Mateo County. These lines are identified with a "2" in the first digit of the three digit line number.

Local bus routes with both BART and Caltrain connection 
These SamTrans bus routes connect to both BART and Caltrain stations in San Mateo County. These routes are identified with a "3" in the first digit of the three-digit route number.  Route ECR also fall into this category.

Community Bus Lines 
These bus lines are community bus service that serves local schools, communities, and senior centers within the local regions. These bus lines are identified as two digit line numbers (With the exception of route 117).

Former Routes

References

External links 
List of SamTrans Routes and Schedules

SamTrans
San Mateo County